Cora Bora is an 2022 American comedy-drama film, directed by Hannah Pearl Utt, from a screenplay by Rhianon Jones. It stars Megan Stalter, Jojo T. Gibbs, Manny Jacinto, Ayden Mayeri, Thomas Mann, Chrissie Fit, Andre Hyland, Chelsea Peretti, Margaret Cho and Darrell Hammond.

It had its world premiere at South by Southwest on March 12, 2023.

Cast
 Megan Stalter as Cora
 Jojo T. Gibbs as Justine
 Manny Jacinto as Tom
 Ayden Mayeri as Riley
 Thomas Mann
 Chrissie Fit as Cristina
 Andre Hyland as Jeremiah 
 Chelsea Peretti
 Margaret Cho
 Darrell Hammond
 Heather Morris

Production
In May 2022, it was announced Megan Stalter, Jojo T. Gibbs, Manny Jacinto, Ayden Mayeri, Thomas Mann, Chrissie Fit, Andre Hyland and Heather Morris joined the cast of the film, with Hannah Pearl Utt directing from a screenplay by Rhianon Jones.

Release
The film had its world premiere at South by Southwest on March 12, 2023.

Reception

References

External links
 

2023 films
American drama films
American comedy films
2023 LGBT-related films
American LGBT-related films